Carsten Nørgaard (born March 3, 1963) is a Danish actor. Norgaard was born in Frederiksberg, Denmark. He began his career playing the enigmatic Dolphin Man in the 1988 film The Fruit Machine (known as Wonderland in the U.S.). Norgaard also appeared in the Disney film D2: The Mighty Ducks (1994). Notable recent appearances include The Man in the High Castle, a 2015 American alternate history TV series, and American Traitor: The Trial of Axis Sally , an account of the life of World War II propagandist Mildred Gillars.

Nørgaard broke a rib during the filming of Alien Vs. Predator. 

In Ireland he is most famous as the face of the Norwegian oil company Statoil having featured in their TV adverts there in the 1990s.

Nørgaard has an economics degree from Denmark and has studied at Actors Centre in London. He participated in the Tour de Rouge charitable bicycle race in 2019.

Filmography

1988: The Fruit Machine - Dolphin Man
1990: The Strange Affliction of Anton Bruckner (TV Movie) - Hans
1990: The Manageress (TV Series) - Brian Scherfig
1991: Prisoner of Honor (TV Movie) - Col. von Schwartzkoppen
1992: Tales from Hollywood (TV Series) - Young Man
1993: Red Shoe Diaries - (episode "Midnight Bells") (video)
1994: D2: The Mighty Ducks - Coach Wolf Stansson
1995: Highlander: The Series (TV Series) - Kanwulf
1995: Out of Annie's Past (TV Movie) - Lev Petrovich
1996: The Spartans (Short)
1996: The Ring (TV Movie) - Capt. Manfred Von Tripp
1997: House of Frankenstein (TV Mini-Series) - Williger
1998: Soldier - Green
1999: David and Lola - Liam
2000: Missing Pieces (TV Movie) - Reinhardt
2001: The Gristle - Race
2003: Gods and Generals - Maj. Gen. Darius Nash Couch
2004: Alien vs. Predator - Rusten Quinn
2006: End Game - Arman
2007: The Black Pimpernel - Winther
2007:  - Gregory Ridgeley
2007: Resident Evil: Extinction - Zombie Steve (uncredited)
2010: CSI: Crime Scene Investigation (TV Series) - German Agent #1
2011: The Three Musketeers - Jussac
2012: Sinbad (TV Series) - Obsedian
2012: Rita (TV Series) - Tom Dyrehave
2013: Air Force One Is Down  - Russian defence minister
2013: Sleepy Hollow (TV Series) - Hessian Soldier
2015: The Man in the High Castle (TV Series) - SS-Standartenführer Rudolph Wegener
2016: Grimm - Krisztian
2021: American Traitor: The Trial of Axis Sally  - Max Otto Koischwitz
2022:  - Hermann Goring
2022: Cobra Kai season 5 - Gunther

References

External links

1963 births
Danish male actors
Danish male film actors
Living people
People from Frederiksberg